Charlie Taumoepeau (born March 25, 1998) is an American football fullback for the Seattle Sea Dragons of the XFL. He played college football at Portland State.

High school career 
Taumoepeau played high school football at Federal Way High School. He was not heavily recruited and unranked by 247sports.com coming out of high school. He committed to Portland State to play football.

College career 
Taumoepeau was named to the 2019 Big Sky Football All Conference Team following his senior season. Taumoepeau was also a participant in the 2020 Senior Bowl.

Professional career

Dallas Cowboys
Taumoepeau signed with the Dallas Cowboys as an undrafted free agent on April 27, 2020. He was waived on September 2, 2020.

Indianapolis Colts
Taumoepeau signed with the Indianapolis Colts practice squad on September 8, 2020. He was released on September 22.

San Francisco 49ers
On September 30, 2020, Taumoepeau was signed to the San Francisco 49ers practice squad. He was released on October 6.

Detroit Lions
On May 17, 2021, Taumoepeau signed with the Detroit Lions. On August 16, 2021, he was placed on the non-football injury list after being injured in a car accident driven by ex-teammate Alex Brown. He was released on March 16, 2022.

St Louis BattleHawks 
On January 1, 2023, Taumoepeau was selected by the St. Louis BattleHawks in the 14th round of the 2023 XFL Supplemental Draft.

References

External links 
Portland State bio

1998 births
Living people
People from Federal Way, Washington
Players of American football from Washington (state)
Sportspeople from King County, Washington
American football tight ends
Portland State Vikings football players
Dallas Cowboys players
Indianapolis Colts players
San Francisco 49ers players
Detroit Lions players
St. Louis BattleHawks players